Rogue Angel is a series of paperback novels produced bi-monthly since July 2006 by Harlequin Enterprises, published under a succession of imprints and written under the house name of "Alex Archer". Actual authors are credited with small notes inside the books but not on the front covers or spines. The main character is Annja Creed. Each novel relates to history or mythology with a heavy fantasy slant.

Background
Books in the series can be read individually. When read in order, character development and sub-plots may be followed.

Typically, each volume is named after a historical or mythological artifact, around which the plot revolves. The plot structure tends to follow a pattern where the heroine discovers the item in question. The villain or another party then steals the item or abducts the heroine, motivated by their believing the item holds special power or significance. In the course of the story, the heroine discovers more about a historical period and the people who lived in it.

Series history
The series was first envisioned by Randall Toye, a Harlequin executive who fell in love with the history concerning Joan of Arc and wanted to develop the idea of a present-day Joan. Veteran action-adventure editors Feroze Mohammed and Nicole Brebner teamed up with Mel Odom to flesh out their series.

The first eight novels were written by Mel Odom and Victor Milán. New writers joining the series starting with book nine include Jon Merz, Michele Hauf, Jean Rabe, and Joseph Nassise.

Influences
Rogue Angel'''s premise and execution display similarities with earlier franchises such as the Witchblade comic book (published since 1995) and TV series (2001-02), Tomb Raider (1996-present), and Outlanders (1997–present).

Characters

Annja Creed
Annja Creed is a world-traveling archaeologist with a penchant for arcane history and adventure. Heir to Joan of Arc's mystic sword and an ambiguous heroic destiny, she frequently finds herself exposed to both. She is portrayed as beautiful and intelligent.

Growing up in an orphanage, Annja, partly due to her lack of knowledge of her own origins, developed a love of history, as well as an interest in martial arts. She then earned a college scholarship and achieved a Masters in Archeology, concentrating on medieval and renaissance time periods, while also acquiring specialized knowledge in anthropology and art. She has written several scholarly as well as popular-scientific articles and books.

Not long after graduating, Annja was offered a job working as a host on Chasing History’s Monsters, a syndicated television show investigating all manner of cryptids drawn from pop culture, folklore, and mythology, and occasionally less far-fetched types of "monsters" such as serial killers. She tries to bring a certain amount of factual material to the episodes she hosts, but the show's producer insists on a more sensationalist and speculative slant. This regularly frustrates her, but the salary and expense account involved allow her to travel freely, and she often puts her status as a minor celebrity to good use.

She resides in a loft in Brooklyn, New York.

The Sword
When Joan of Arc was burned at the stake for heresy, her sword was shattered by an English soldier, and the fragments were widely dispersed. However, Roux and Garin, two of the knights in her personal retinue, were cursed with immortality in order to be able to eventually track down and reassemble the artifact.

Annja was present when this came to pass, and at her touch, the blade magically reformed, making her its new bearer. It cannot be taken from her against her will, and she has the power to remove it to and retrieve it from a supernatural location referred to as "the Otherwhere". This process works regardless of the Sword's current location, giving her the ability to, for example, use the weapon as a projectile and then immediately recall it to her hand.

Moreover, it also enhances her general constitution and helps her recover from injuries.

Recurring

Roux
Roux is apparently in his sixties, but has actually been alive for more than five hundred years. The precise extent of his immortality has not been revealed, though one of the later books (River of Nightmares) shows that it is not merely longevity but imbues him with an ability to recover from wounds that outstrips even Annja's.

He and Annja are in a mentor-protege relationship, however reluctant and long-distance. At the same time, he has his own agenda, such as tracking down a variety of other purportedly magical items for reasons ranging from simple personal ambition to the genuine desire to keep them out of hands that would use them for harm, and he is not above manipulating others, including Annja, to accomplish this.

He resides in a castle-like mansion outside of Paris, France.

Garin
Garin Braden was Roux's apprentice in Joan's day. Physically, he falls squarely into the "tall, dark, and handsome" category, and he has grown considerably wealthy and powerful, with a wide range of employees and resources at his beck and call. He is arrogant and ruthless, but also experiences and acts on the occasional selfless impulse.

His relationships with both Roux and Annja are complicated. He was initially afraid that the reforming of the Sword would put an end to his longevity and consequently made several attempts to destroy or at least separate Annja and the artifact. This concern lessens over time, though, and he increasingly develops fondness of and respect for her. His feelings towards Roux appear to be a mix of deep-rooted attachment and resentment.

His main residence is in Germany, but his lifestyle is even more cosmopolitan than Annja's.

Doug Morrell
Doug Morrell produces Chasing History's Monsters and is a stereotypical media personality - young, supremely self-involved, and with a staggering disregard for facts, especially when they threaten to get in the way of ratings. His relationship with Annja is sufficiently solid to survive the frequent disagreements this causes, though.

Series listing

 Renaissance (2008) collects books 1,2,3
 Babel Codex'' (September 2013) (free novella, written by Mel Odom)

Post-Shutdown Titles (Graphic Audio Exclusives)
Following the shutdown of Gold Eagle Publishing by Harlequin, the primary creator of audiobook adaptions of the franchise, Graphic Audio, acquired the rights to create original, in-house sequels to the novels, available exclusively in a narrated audio drama format.

Adaptations

Audiobooks
In January 2007, GraphicAudio began releasing the books in a dramatized audio format, starting at issue #1.

As of February 2016 they have produced the entire series up to Rogue Angel #57 "Mystic Warrior".

As of May 21, 2019 they have produced up to book #60 "In the Serpent's Tomb".

Comics
In 2008 IDW Publishing released a miniseries (five issues) written by Barbara Kesel and featuring art by Renae De Liz.

References

External links

Publisher sites
 Series listing @ graphicaudio.net (for the dramatized audio adaptations).

Other resources
 .
 Detailed listing @ jamesaxler.com (unofficial site for another of Harlequin's corporate personas).

Miscellaneous
 Annja Creed's profile @ Myspace.

Rogue Angel
Harlequin Enterprises
Harlequin books